Cristóbal Ignacio Finch Barrios (born 1 June 2002) is a Chilean professional footballer who plays as a centre back for Chilean club A.C. Barnechea on loan from Universidad Católica.

Career

Universidad Catolica
Finch made his professional debut playing for Universidad Catolica in a 2021 Copa Chile match against Everton de Viña del Mar on 3 July 2021.

Career statistics

Club

Honours

Club
Universidad Católica

Primera División: 2020, 2021
 Supercopa de Chile: 2020, 2021

References

External links
 

2002 births
Living people
Footballers from Santiago
Chilean footballers
Association football forwards
Chilean Primera División players
Club Deportivo Universidad Católica footballers